Coneythorpe is a village in North Yorkshire, England.

External links

Coneythorpe at Streetmap.co.uk

Villages in North Yorkshire